Hall i' th' Wood railway station is the last stop before Bolton on the Northern Trains franchise's Ribble Valley Line into Blackburn and Clitheroe in England.

The station opened by British Rail on 29 September 1986. It is located in the middle of a housing estate and forms an unofficial footpath between the two sides. In March 2008 work began on a new car park for the station.

It takes its name from the nearby Hall i' th' Wood, now a museum which is within walking distance of the station.

Facilities
The station is unmanned and has basic amenities - waiting shelters and timetable posters on each platform, plus a telephone. The wooden platforms are staggered, with the southbound one the further north of the two.  There is no step-free access to either platform (the ramps from the road that passes beneath the line both have steps).

Services
The former franchise operator Arriva Rail North announced a much enhanced all day half-hourly service Weekdays and Saturdays in both directions from Dec 2017, rather than merely at morning and evening peak periods as before.
The timetable was affected by weekend engineering work south of Bolton (as part of the heavily delayed Manchester to Preston Line electrification project) for much of 2018.

References

External links

Railway stations in the Metropolitan Borough of Bolton
DfT Category F2 stations
Railway stations opened by British Rail
Railway stations in Great Britain opened in 1986
Northern franchise railway stations